Justin S. Carroll (born December 8, 1995) is an American professional stock car racing driver who competes part-time for his family-owned team, TC Motorsports, in both the NASCAR Craftsman Truck Series, driving the No. 90 Toyota Tundra, and in the ARCA Menards Series, driving the No. 91 Toyota Camry.

Racing career

Early career
In 2014, he would attempt a challenge to earn a NASCAR K&N Pro Series East ride with Michael Waltrip Racing.

ARCA Menards Series East
In 2015, Carroll, with a partnership with team Precision Performance Motorsports, was able to make his debut in the NASCAR K&N Pro Series East.

In 2018, he would suffer his first retirement due to a handling issue.

NASCAR Truck Series
In 2020, Carroll announced that he was looking towards racing in the NASCAR Gander RV & Outdoors Truck Series. In 2021, Carroll announced plans to race part-time during the 2021 NASCAR Camping World Truck Series, but couldn't due to the lack of qualifying.

On March 9, 2022, Carroll announced plans to race three races during the 2022 NASCAR Camping World Truck Series season, with more races dependent on sponsorship. He failed to qualify for all 5 of his attempts. His closest call at making a race was at Bristol, where he missed the race by just 0.145 seconds.

On August 31, 2022, Carroll stated in an interview with Christian Koelle from Kickin' the Tires that he and his team would return to the Truck and ARCA Series part-time again in 2023.

Personal life
His father, Terry Carroll, owns the team Justin drives for, TC Motorsports. He graduated from Warhill High School in Williamsburg, VA

Motorsports career results

NASCAR
(key) (Bold – Pole position awarded by qualifying time. Italics – Pole position earned by points standings or practice time. * – Most laps led.)

Craftsman Truck Series

ARCA Menards Series

ARCA Menards Series East

References

External links 
 Official website
 

1995 births
Living people
NASCAR drivers
ARCA Menards Series drivers
Sportspeople from Virginia
Racing drivers from Virginia